The 1995–96 Calgary Flames season was the 16th National Hockey League season in Calgary. The Flames entered the season with their fifth coach in five seasons, hiring Pierre Page to replace Dave King. Page, who had previously been an assistant coach with the Flames in the 1980s, left his head coaching position with the Quebec Nordiques to move west.

The Flames began the season with a disastrous start, posting a 4–15–5 record through the end of November. The team's poor start was exacerbated by the holdout of Joe Nieuwendyk, who was unable to reach a contract agreement with the Flames. Also, the Flames began the season on a long, seven game road trip while renovations to the Olympic Saddledome were completed. The Flames reached a low point on October 27, 1995, when they set a franchise record for futility, recording just eight shots in a 3–0 loss to the Detroit Red Wings on home ice.

The Nieuwendyk saga finally came to a close when the Flames dealt him to the Dallas Stars for Corey Millen, and Western Hockey League star Jarome Iginla on December 19. Nieuwendyk immediately ended his holdout, signing a five-year, $11 million contract with Dallas.

The Flames began to turn the season around, led by Gary Roberts' comeback from neck injuries that had kept him out most of the 1994–95 season. Roberts' comeback lasted only 35 games before he was again sidelined with bone spurs and nerve damage in his neck. Roberts would score an incredible 22 goals and 42 points during that time, earning him the Bill Masterton Memorial Trophy for perseverance and dedication to hockey.

The Flames recovered from their woeful start to finish second in the Pacific Division, and as the sixth seed in the Western Conference. The Flames were swept, however, by the Chicago Blackhawks in the first round of the playoffs, as the team once again failed to win a playoff series since they won the Stanley Cup in 1989. One notable player made his debut during the playoffs: Jarome Iginla, who would become a star for the Flames for years to come. The Flames would not qualify for the playoffs again until 2004, missing the post season for the next seven years.

Theoren Fleury represented the Flames at the 46th National Hockey League All-Star Game. It was the first since 1986 that the Flames had only one representative.

Regular season

Season standings

Schedule and results

Playoffs
Despite finishing 2nd in the Pacific Division, the Flames were only the 6th seed in the playoffs. They met the 2nd-place finisher in the Central Division, the Chicago Blackhawks. It was the third time Calgary and Chicago had met in the playoffs, as the Flames had previously defeated the Blackhawks in 1981, and 1989. This time around, Chicago had the better of the Flames, sweeping Calgary out in four straight, and continuing the Flames playoff futility.

Looking for a spark, the Flames signed junior star Jarome Iginla to a contract before the third game, allowing him to make his NHL debut at home.  Iginla scored a goal and an assist in his first two games.

This series was the Flames last playoff appearance for eight years, as Calgary did not return to the post season until 2004.

Player statistics

Skaters
Note: GP = Games played; G = Goals; A = Assists; Pts = Points; PIM = Penalty minutes

†Denotes player spent time with another team before joining Calgary.  Stats reflect time with the Flames only.
‡Traded mid-season

Goaltenders
Note: GP = Games played; TOI = Time on ice (minutes); W = Wins; L = Losses; OT = Overtime/shootout losses; GA = Goals against; SO = Shutouts; GAA = Goals against average

Transactions
The Flames were involved in the following transactions during the 1995–96 season.

Trades

Free agents

Draft picks

Calgary's picks at the 1995 NHL Entry Draft, held in Edmonton, Alberta.

Farm teams

Saint John Flames
The Baby Flames finished the 1995–96 American Hockey League season in second place in the Canadian Division with a 35–30–11–4 record. The tied the Prince Edward Island Senators in points, but lost out on the division title by virtue of having three fewer wins.  The Flames defeated the St. John's Maple Leafs three games to one, then knocked off the Fredericton Canadiens four games to one before falling to the Portland Pirates in seven games.  Ladislav Kohn led the Flames with 28 goals and 73 points. Dwayne Roloson was the starting goaltender, posting a 33–22–11 record with a 2.83 GAA in 67 games.

See also
1995–96 NHL season

References

Player stats: 2006–07 Calgary Flames Media Guide, pg 116
Game log: 1995–96 Calgary Flames game log, usatoday.com, accessed January 26, 2007
Team standings:  1995–96 NHL standings @hockeydb.com
Trades: hockeydb.com player pages

Calgary Flames seasons
Calgary Flames season, 1995-96
Calg
Calgary Flames
Calgary Flames